Kildare County F.C. was an Irish association football club based in Newbridge, County Kildare.  Between 2002–03 and 2009 they played in the League of Ireland First Division. During this time they also entered a team in the League of Ireland U21 Division.

History

Foundation
Kildare County was formed in 2002 by members of Newbridge Town F.C. in order to enter a team in the League of Ireland First Division. After St Francis withdrew from the First Division just two weeks before the start of the 2001–02 season, the League of Ireland began to look for a replacement club for 2002–03. Twelve clubs, including Newbridge Town, were approached to see if they were interested in joining the First Division. Members of Newbridge Town subsequently decided to form Kildare County as a separate legal entity and applied to join the First Division. The name Kildare County was chosen in an attempt to attract potential sponsors, players and supporters from throughout County Kildare. In February 2002 it was announced that Kildare County would be offered the First Division place ahead of Mullingar Town.

Early seasons
In March 2002 Kildare County appointed Dermot Keely as their first manager and John Gill as his assistant. On 15 June 2002 the club made their official debut in a friendly against Bray Wanderers. The game finished 2–2 with Keith O'Connor and Alan Kelly becoming the first and second players to score for County. On 6 July 2002 Kildare County made their competitive debut against Limerick at Station Road in a First Division Cup game. Philip Gorman and Shey Zellor scored for County as they won 2–0. On 24 August County made their League of Ireland First Division debut at Station Road again against Limerick. This time they lost 3–1 with Philip Gorman scoring the club's first league goal. Dermot Keely remained in charge of County for the 2002–03 season, guiding them to fifth place. In July 2003, midway through the 2003 season, Keely resigned as County manager in order to take charge of Derry City. During their first three seasons in the League of Ireland First Division, Kildare County challenged for promotion to the League of Ireland Premier Division and on each occasion finished just outside the qualifying places for the promotion play-offs. In the 2002–03 First Division Cup they won their regional group and finished as overall runners up, losing 4–0 on aggregate in the final to Finn Harps. They were also quarter-finalists in both the 2003 and 2004 FAI Cups.

Decline
Between 2005 and 2009, Kildare County finished in the bottom half of League of Ireland First Division table every season. In 2008 Kildare County finished bottom of the table and were initially relegated to the A Championship after losing the  promotion/relegation play-off to Mervue United. However they subsequently gained a reprieve after Cobh Ramblers were refused a First Division license and were relegated directly from the 2008 Premier Division to the A Championship. In 2009 Kildare County again finished bottom of the table and they subsequently withdrew from the league. The last fixture the club played was against Shelbourne on Saturday, 7 November 2009. In the week before the game the entire club board and the team manager Joe Somerville  resigned, leaving the club's players unpaid. The players were owed a total of €21,650 and as a result were reluctant to take to the pitch. However Stephen McGuinness, the general secretary of the PFAI, persuaded the players to participate in the game. Meanwhile, fans had to run the ticket sales and canteen. County lost 5–1 and after fulfilling this last game, it was officially over. County were due to play Salthill Devon in a promotion/relegation play-off but as a result of their resignation this did not happen and Salthill Devon subsequently replaced Kildare County in the 2010 First Division.

U21 Division
In addition to playing in the League of Ireland First Division, Kildare County also entered a team in the
League of Ireland U21 Division. In 2006, with a team managed by Thomas Donnelly, they reached the Enda McGuill Cup final, losing 1–0 to Cork City in the final.

League placings

Notable players
League of Ireland XI representative
  Ger O'Brien

Republic of Ireland U23 internationals
  Gareth Cronin
  Ger O'Brien

Republic of Ireland U21 internationals
  Pádraig Amond
  Thomas Morgan
  Richie Purdy

Republic of Ireland U18 internationals
  Lorcan Cronin

Republic of Ireland U17 internationals
  Gareth Cronin
  Alan Keely
  Mark Kenny
  Alan McDermott
  Ger Robinson

 Top goalscorer
  Philip Gorman (27) 
 Most appearances
  Philip Byrne: (124)

Managers

Honours
First Division Cup
 Runners up: 2002–03: 1
Enda McGuill Cup
 Runners up: 2006: 1

Gallery

References

External links
  Kildare County F.C. on Facebook

 
Association football clubs established in 2002
Association football clubs disestablished in 2009
Defunct League of Ireland clubs
Association football clubs in County Kildare
2002 establishments in Ireland
2009 disestablishments in Ireland
Former League of Ireland First Division clubs